Seethala Gini Kandu ( Translation: Cold Volcanoes) is a 2002 Sri Lankan Sinhala thriller action film directed and produced by Daya Wimalaweera. It stars Jeevan Kumaratunga and Dilani Abeywardana in lead roles along with Kamal Addararachchi, and Dilhani Ekanayake. Music composed by Sarath Dassanayake. It is the 976th Sri Lankan film in the Sinhala cinema.

Plot
Sunny aka 'Henahura' is a local crime lord who is producing and distributing illicit liquor. He lives with Rosy. Rosy was taken with him forcibly, as the settlement of debt her husband owed to Sunny. He has a biological daughter (Dilhani) from a woman whom he raped (Menik Kurukulasooriya), and she lives with her mother. She is in love with Rohana, an ordinary youth who sells king coconut for living. Rohana’s sister (Udaya Kumari Ranasinghe) is in love with an excise officer (Priyankara Perera).

When one of Sunny’s thugs (Sando Harris) is imposing violence on an innocent person, Rohana intervenes and beats him. Then the rift between Sunny and Rohana begins. While Rohana is coming to sign as witness for Dona Celesthina Josapeenu’s (Susila Kottage) marriage, he is attacked and his belly is cut. Rosy’s husband dressed with a bandage over his stomach, comes at night and attacks Sunny’s henchmen. Sunny and his men think it was Rohana because of the bandage over the stomach. They attack Rohana’s house and Rohana’s mother (Deepani Silva) is killed. Sunny’s daughter and her mother are taken to Sunny’s house. Sunny reveals who he is and then goes to bath. Rohana goes to avenge his mother’s murder. On the way he meets excise officer and he also joins him. They manage to beat Sunny’s henchmen. Rohana reaches the well where Sunny is being bathed by Rosy. As she sees Rohana coming closer, she rubs soap on Sunny’s face and eyes to avoid sunny seeing Rohana. Rohana drags by Rosy’s hair and throws her away. But before Rohana puts his hands on Sunny, Sunny’s daughter stabs sunny.

Cast
 Jeevan Kumaratunga as Sunny
 Dilani Abeywardana as Rosalyn aka Rosy
 Kamal Addararachchi as Rohana
 Dilhani Ekanayake as Sunny's daughter
 Priyankara Perera as excise officer
 Udaya Kumari as Rohans's sister
 Shashi Wijendra as Rosy's husband
 Bandu Samarasinghe as Addiya
 Tennyson Cooray as Tamil policeman
 Wimal Wikramarachchi as excise chief
 Channa Perera
 Denawaka Hamine
 Deepani Silva as Rohana's mother
 Susila Kottage as Dona Celesthina Josapeenu
 Mark Samson
 Menik Kurukulasooriya
 Sando Harris

Soundtrack

References

2004 films
2000s Sinhala-language films